

Events

Pre-1600
 536 – Gothic War: The Byzantine general Belisarius enters Rome unopposed; the Gothic garrison flees the capital.
 730 – Battle of Marj Ardabil: The Khazars annihilate an Umayyad army and kill its commander, al-Jarrah ibn Abdallah al-Hakami.
1432 – The first battle between the forces of Švitrigaila and Sigismund Kęstutaitis is fought near the town of Oszmiana (Ashmyany), launching the most active phase of the Lithuanian Civil War.
1531 – The Virgin of Guadalupe first appears to Juan Diego at Tepeyac, Mexico City.

1601–1900
1688 – Glorious Revolution: Williamite forces defeat Jacobites at Battle of Reading, forcing James II to flee England. (Date is Old Style; the date in the New Style modern calendar is 19 December.)
1775 – American Revolutionary War: British troops and Loyalists, misinformed about Patriot militia strength, lose the Battle of Great Bridge, ending British rule in Virginia.
1822 – French physicist Augustin-Jean Fresnel, in a memoir read to the Academy of Sciences, coins the terms linear polarization, circular polarization, and elliptical polarization, and reports a direct refraction experiment verifying his theory that optical rotation is a form of birefringence.
1824 – Patriot forces led by General Antonio José de Sucre defeat a Royalist army in the Battle of Ayacucho, putting an end to the Peruvian War of Independence.
1835 – Texas Revolution: The Texian Army captures San Antonio following the Siege of Béxar.
1851 – The first YMCA in North America is established in Montreal.
1856 – The Iranian city of Bushehr surrenders to occupying British forces.
1861 – American Civil War: The Joint Committee on the Conduct of the War is established by Congress.
1868 – The first traffic lights are installed, outside the Palace of Westminster in London. Resembling railway signals, they use semaphore arms and are illuminated at night by red and green gas lamps.
1872 – In Louisiana, P. B. S. Pinchback becomes the first African American governor of a U.S. state following the impeachment of Henry C. Warmoth.

1901–present
1905 – In France, a law separating church and state is passed.
1911 – A mine explosion near Briceville, Tennessee, kills 84 miners despite rescue efforts led by the United States Bureau of Mines.
1917 – World War I: Field Marshal Allenby captures Jerusalem from the Ottoman Empire.
1922 – Gabriel Narutowicz is elected the first president of Poland.
1931 – The Constituent Cortes approves a constitution which establishes the Second Spanish Republic. 
1935 – Student protests occur in Beijing's Tiananmen Square, and are subsequently dispersed by government authorities.
  1935   – Walter Liggett, an American newspaper editor and muckraker, is killed in a gangland murder.
1937 – Second Sino-Japanese War: Battle of Nanking: Japanese troops under the command of Lt. Gen. Yasuhiko Asaka launch an assault on the Chinese city of Nanking.
1940 – World War II: Operation Compass: British and Indian troops under the command of Major-General Richard O'Connor attack Italian forces near Sidi Barrani in Egypt.
1941 – World War II: China, Cuba, Guatemala, and the Philippine Commonwealth declare war on Germany and Japan.
  1941   – World War II: The American 19th Bombardment Group attacks Japanese ships off the coast of Vigan, Luzon.
1946 – The subsequent Nuremberg trials begin with the Doctors' Trial, prosecuting physicians and officers alleged to be involved in Nazi human experimentation and mass murder under the guise of euthanasia.
  1946   – The Constituent Assembly of India meets for the first time to write the Constitution of India.
1948 – The Genocide Convention is adopted.
1950 – Cold War: Harry Gold is sentenced to 30 years in jail for helping Klaus Fuchs pass information about the Manhattan Project to the Soviet Union. His testimony is later instrumental in the prosecution of Julius and Ethel Rosenberg.
1953 – Red Scare: General Electric announces that all communist employees will be discharged from the company.
1956 – Trans-Canada Air Lines Flight 810, a Canadair North Star, crashes near Hope, British Columbia, Canada, killing all 62 people on board.
1960 – The first episode of Coronation Street, the world's longest-running television soap opera, is broadcast in the United Kingdom.
1961 – Tanganyika becomes independent from Britain.
1965 – Kecksburg UFO incident: A fireball is seen from Michigan to Pennsylvania; with witnesses reporting something crashing in the woods near Pittsburgh.
1968 – Douglas Engelbart gave what became known as "The Mother of All Demos", publicly debuting the computer mouse, hypertext, and the bit-mapped graphical user interface using the oN-Line System (NLS).
1969 – U.S. Secretary of State William P. Rogers proposes his plan for a ceasefire in the War of Attrition; Egypt and Jordan accept it over the objections of the PLO, which leads to civil war in Jordan in September 1970.
1971 – Indo-Pakistani War: The Indian Air Force executes an airdrop of Indian Army units, bypassing Pakistani defences.
1973 – British and Irish authorities sign the Sunningdale Agreement in an attempt to establish a power-sharing Northern Ireland Executive and a cross-border Council of Ireland.
1979 – The eradication of the smallpox virus is certified, making smallpox the first of only two diseases that have been driven to extinction (with rinderpest in 2011 being the other).
1987 – Israeli–Palestinian conflict: The First Intifada begins in the Gaza Strip and West Bank.
1992 – American troops land in Somalia for Operation Restore Hope. 
1996 – Gwen Jacob is acquitted of committing an indecent act, giving women the right to be topless in Ontario, Canada.
2003 – A blast in the center of Moscow kills six people and wounds several more.
2008 – Governor of Illinois Rod Blagojevich is arrested by federal officials for crimes including attempting to sell the U.S. Senate seat being vacated by President-elect Barack Obama.
2012 – A plane crash in Mexico kills seven people.
2013 – At least seven are dead and 63 are injured following a train accident near Bintaro, Indonesia.
2016 – President Park Geun-hye of South Korea is impeached by the country's National Assembly in response to a major political scandal.
  2016   – At least 57 people are killed and a further 177 injured when two schoolgirl suicide bombers attack a market area in Madagali, Adamawa, Nigeria in the Madagali suicide bombings.
2017 – The Marriage Amendment Bill receives royal assent and comes into effect, making Australia the 26th country to legalize same-sex marriage.
2019 – A volcano on Whakaari / White Island, New Zealand, kills 22 people after it erupts.
 2021 – Fifty-five people are killed and more than 100 injured when a truck with 160 migrants from Central America overturned in Chiapas, Mexico.

Births

Pre-1600
1392 – Peter, Duke of Coimbra (d. 1449)
1447 – Chenghua Emperor of China (d. 1487)
1482 – Frederick II, Elector Palatine (d. 1556)
1493 – Íñigo López de Mendoza, 4th Duke of the Infantado (d. 1566)
1508 – Gemma Frisius, Dutch mathematician and cartographer (d. 1555)
1561 – Edwin Sandys, English lawyer and politician (d. 1629)
1571 – Metius, Dutch mathematician and astronomer (d. 1635)
1579 – Martin de Porres, Peruvian saint (d. 1639)
1594 – Gustavus Adolphus of Sweden (d. 1632)

1601–1900
1608 – John Milton, English poet and philosopher (d. 1674)
1610 – Baldassare Ferri, Italian singer and actor (d. 1680)
1617 – Richard Lovelace, English poet (d. 1657)
1652 – Augustus Quirinus Rivinus, German physician and botanist (d. 1723)
1667 – William Whiston, English mathematician, historian, and theologian (d. 1752)
1717 – Johann Joachim Winckelmann, German archaeologist and historian (d. 1768)
1721 – Peter Pelham, English-American organist and composer (d. 1805)
1728 – Pietro Alessandro Guglielmi, Italian composer (d. 1804)
1742 – Carl Wilhelm Scheele, Swedish Pomeranian and German pharmaceutical chemist (d. 1786)
1745 – Maddalena Laura Sirmen, Italian violinist and composer (d. 1818)
1748 – Claude Louis Berthollet, French chemist and academic (d. 1822)
1752 – Antoine Étienne de Tousard, French general and engineer (d. 1813)
1787 – John Dobson, English architect, designed Eldon Square and Lilburn Tower (d. 1865)
1779 – Tabitha Babbitt,  American tool maker and inventor (d. 1853)
1806 – Jean-Olivier Chénier, Canadian physician (d. 1838)
1813 – Thomas Andrews, Irish chemist and physicist (d. 1885)
1837 – Émile Waldteufel, French pianist, composer, and conductor (d. 1915)
1842 – Peter Kropotkin, Russian zoologist, economist, geographer, and philosopher (d. 1921)
1845 – Joel Chandler Harris, American journalist and author (d. 1908)
1850 – Emma Abbott, American soprano and actress (d. 1891)
1861 – Hélène Smith, French psychic and occultist (d. 1929)
1867 – Gregorios Xenopoulos, Greek journalist and author (d. 1951)
1868 – Fritz Haber, Polish-German chemist and academic, Nobel Prize laureate (d. 1934)
1870 – Ida S. Scudder, Indian physician and missionary (d. 1960)
  1870   – Francisco S. Carvajal, Mexican lawyer and politician, president 1914 (d. 1932)
1871 – Joe Kelley, American baseball player and manager (d. 1943)
1873 – George Blewett, Canadian philosopher, author, and academic (d. 1912)
1875 – Harry Miller, American engineer (d. 1943)
1876 – Berton Churchill, Canadian-American actor and singer (d. 1940)
1882 – Elmer Booth, American actor (d. 1915)
  1882   – Joaquín Turina, Spanish-French composer, critic, and educator (d. 1949)
1883 – Nikolai Luzin, Russian mathematician, theorist, and academic (d. 1950)
  1883   – Alexander Papagos, Greek general and politician, 152nd Prime Minister of Greece (d. 1955)
  1883   – Joseph Pilates, German-American fitness expert, developed Pilates (d. 1967)
1886 – Clarence Birdseye, American businessman, founded Birds Eye (d. 1956)
1887 – Tim Moore, American actor (d. 1958)
1889 – Hannes Kolehmainen, Finnish-American runner (d. 1966)
1890 – Laura Salverson, Canadian author (d. 1970)
1891 – Maksim Bahdanovič, Belarusian poet and critic (d. 1917)
1892 – André Randall, French actor (d. 1974)
1895 – Dolores Ibárruri, Spanish activist, journalist and politician (d. 1989)
  1895   – Conchita Supervía, Spanish soprano and actress (d. 1936)
1897 – Hermione Gingold, English actress and singer (d. 1987)
1898 – Irene Greenwood, Australian radio broadcaster and feminist and peace activist (d. 1992)
  1898   – Emmett Kelly, American clown and actor (d. 1979)
1899 – Jean de Brunhoff, French author and illustrator (d. 1937)
1900 – Margaret Brundage, American illustrator, known for illustrating pulp magazine Weird Tales (d. 1976)
  1900   – Albert Weisbord, American activist, founded the Communist League of Struggle (d. 1977)

1901–present
1901 – Jean Mermoz, French pilot and politician (d. 1936)
  1901   – Ödön von Horváth, Hungarian-German author and playwright (d. 1938)
1902 – Margaret Hamilton, American schoolteacher, actress and voice artist (d. 1985)
1904 – Robert Livingston, American actor and singer (d. 1988)
1905 – Dalton Trumbo, American author, screenwriter, and blacklistee (d. 1976)
1906 – Grace Hopper, American admiral and computer scientist, designed COBOL (d. 1992)
  1906   – Freddy Martin, American bandleader and tenor saxophonist (d. 1983)
1909 – Douglas Fairbanks Jr., American captain, actor, and producer (d. 2000)
1910 – Vere Bird, first Prime Minister of Antigua and Barbuda (d. 1999)
1911 – Broderick Crawford, American actor (d. 1986)
  1911   – Ryūzō Sejima, Japanese colonel and businessman (d. 2007)
1912 – Tip O'Neill, American lawyer and politician, 55th Speaker of the United States House of Representatives (d. 1994)
  1912   – Jim Turnesa, American golfer (d. 1971)
1914 – Max Manus, Norwegian lieutenant (d. 1996)
  1914   – Frances Reid, American actress (d. 2010)
  1914   – Ljubica Sokić, Serbian painter and illustrator (d. 2009)
1915 – Eloise Jarvis McGraw, American author (d. 2000)
  1915   – Elisabeth Schwarzkopf, German-Austrian soprano and actress (d. 2006)
1916 – Jerome Beatty Jr., American soldier, journalist, and author (d. 2002)
  1916   – Kirk Douglas, American actor, singer, and producer (d. 2020)
  1916   – Colin McCool, Australian cricketer (d. 1986)
1917 – James Jesus Angleton, American CIA agent (d. 1987)
  1917   – James Rainwater, American physicist and academic, Nobel Prize laureate (d. 1986)
1919 – V. Dakshinamoorthy, Indian singer-songwriter (d. 2013)
  1919   – William Lipscomb, American chemist and academic, Nobel Prize laureate (d. 2011)
1920 – Carlo Azeglio Ciampi, Italian economist and politician, 10th President of Italy (d. 2016)
  1920   – Bruno Ruffo, Italian motorcycle racer and race car driver (d. 2007)
1922 – Redd Foxx, American actor (d. 1991)
  1925   – Roy Rubin, American basketball player and coach (d. 2013)
1926 – Henry Way Kendall, American physicist, photographer, and mountaineer, Nobel Prize laureate (d. 1999)
  1926   – David Nathan, British journalist (d. 2001)
  1926   – Jan Křesadlo, Czech-English psychologist and author (d. 1995)
  1926   – Lorenzo Wright, American sprinter and coach (d. 1972)
1927 – Pierre Henry, French composer (d. 2017)
1928 – Joan Blos, American author and educator (d. 2017)
  1928   – André Milhoux, Belgian race car driver
  1928   – Dick Van Patten, American actor (d. 2015)
1929 – John Cassavetes, American actor, director, and screenwriter (d. 1989)
  1929   – Bob Hawke, Australian union leader and politician, 23rd Prime Minister of Australia (d. 2019)
1930 – Buck Henry, American actor, director, and screenwriter (d. 2020)
  1930   – Óscar Humberto Mejía Víctores, Guatemalan soldier and politician, 27th President of Guatemala (d. 2016)
1931 – Cliff Hagan, American basketball player-coach
  1931   – William Reynolds, American actor (d. 2022)
  1931   – Ladislav Smoljak, Czech actor, director, and screenwriter (d. 2010)
1932 – Donald Byrd, American trumpet player and academic (d. 2013)
  1932   – Bill Hartack, American jockey (d. 2007)
  1932   – Billy Edd Wheeler, American singer-songwriter, guitarist, and playwright
1933 – Ashleigh Brilliant, English-American author and illustrator
  1933   – Milt Campbell, American decathlete and football player (d. 2012)
  1933   – Morton Downey Jr., American actor and talk show host (d. 2001)
  1933   – Orville Moody, American golfer (d. 2008)
1934 – Judi Dench, English actress 
  1934   – Alan Ridout, English composer and teacher (d. 1996)
  1934   – Junior Wells, American blues singer-songwriter and harmonica player (d. 1998)
1938 – David Houston, American singer-songwriter and guitarist (d. 1993)
  1938   – Deacon Jones, American football player, sportscaster, and actor (d. 2013)
  1938   – Dimitrios Trichopoulos, Greek epidemiologist, oncologist, and academic (d. 2014)
1940 – Clancy Eccles, Jamaican singer-songwriter and producer (d. 2005)
1941 – Mehmet Ali Birand, Turkish journalist and author (d. 2013)
  1941   – Beau Bridges, American actor, director, and producer
  1941   – Dan Hicks, American singer-songwriter and guitarist (d. 2016)
1942 – Billy Bremner, Scottish footballer and manager (d. 1997)
  1942   – Dick Butkus, American football player, sportscaster, and actor
  1942   – Germain Gagnon, Canadian ice hockey player (d. 2014)
  1942   – Fred Jones, Australian rugby league player 
  1942   – Joe McGinniss, American journalist and author (d. 2014)
  1942   – William Turnage, American conservationist (d. 2017)
1943 – Pit Martin, Canadian ice hockey player (d. 2008)
  1943   – Joanna Trollope, English author, playwright, and director
  1943   – Kenny Vance, American singer-songwriter and music producer
1944 – Neil Innes, English singer-songwriter (d. 2019)
  1944   – Ki Longfellow, American author, playwright, and producer
  1944   – Bob O'Connor, American businessman and politician, 57th Mayor of Pittsburgh (d. 2006)
1945 – Michael Nouri, American actor
1946 – David Currie, Baron Currie of Marylebone, English economist and academic
  1946   – Dennis Dunaway, American bass player and songwriter
  1946   – Sonia Gandhi, Italian-Indian politician
  1946   – Nicholas Reade, English bishop
1947 – Tom Daschle, American soldier, academic, and politician
  1947   – Jaak Jõerüüt, Estonian politician, 24th Estonian Minister of Defense
  1947   – Allan Jones, English cricketer and umpire
1948 – Marleen Gorris, Dutch director and screenwriter
  1948   – Jonathan Sumption, English historian, author, and judge
1949 – Tom Kite, American golfer and architect
1950 – Joan Armatrading, Kittian-English singer-songwriter and guitarist
1952 – Liaqat Baloch, Pakistani politician
  1952   – Michael Dorn, American actor and voice artist
1953 – Cornelis de Bondt, Dutch composer and educator
  1953   – World B. Free, American basketball player
  1953   – John Malkovich, American actor and producer
1954 – Jean-Claude Juncker, Luxembourger lawyer and politician, Prime Minister of Luxembourg
  1954   – Henk ten Cate, Dutch footballer and manager
1955 – Otis Birdsong, American basketball player and radio host
  1955   – Chamras Saewataporn, Thai singer-songwriter
1956 – Sylvia, American country singer-songwriter
  1956   – Jean-Pierre Thiollet, French journalist and author
1957 – Peter O'Mara, Australian guitarist and composer 
  1957   – Donny Osmond, American singer-songwriter, dancer, and actor
  1957   – Steve Taylor, American singer-songwriter and producer 
1959 – Susan Bullock, English soprano
1960 – Stefen Fangmeier, American visual effects designer and director
  1960   – Caroline Lucas, English activist and politician
  1960   – Dobroslav Paraga, Croatian politician
  1960   – Juan Samuel, Dominican-American baseball player and manager
1961 – David Anthony Higgins, American actor and screenwriter
1962 – Felicity Huffman, American actress and producer
  1962   – Roxanne Swentzell, Santa Clara Pueblo (Native American) ceramic sculptor
1963 – Empress Masako, Empress of Japan
  1963   – Dave Hilton Jr., Canadian boxer
1964 – Michael Foster, American drummer
  1964   – Ross Harrington, Australian rugby league player 
  1964   – Hape Kerkeling, German actor and singer
  1964   – Les Kiss, Australian rugby league player
  1964   – Johannes B. Kerner, German journalist and sportscaster
  1964   – Paul Landers, German guitarist 
1965 – Joe Ausanio, American baseball player and coach
1966 – Kirsten Gillibrand, American lawyer and politician
  1966   – Dave Harold, English snooker player
  1966   – Gideon Sa'ar, Israeli lawyer and politician, 24th Israeli Minister of Internal Affairs
  1966   – Martin Taylor, English footballer and coach
1967 – Joshua Bell, American violinist and conductor
  1967   – Jason Dozzell, English footballer and manager
1968 – Kurt Angle, American freestyle and professional wrestler
  1968   – Brian Bell, American singer-songwriter and guitarist 
  1968   – Brent Price, American basketball player
1969 – Jakob Dylan, American singer-songwriter and guitarist 
  1969   – Saskia Garel, Jamaican-Canadian singer-songwriter 
  1969   – Lori Greiner, American businesswoman
  1969   – Bixente Lizarazu, French footballer
  1969   – Raphaël Rouquier, French mathematician and academic
1970 – Kara DioGuardi, American singer-songwriter and producer 
  1970   – Lance Krall, American actor, director, producer, and screenwriter
1971 – Geoff Barrow, English drummer, DJ, composer, and producer 
  1971   – Nick Hysong, American pole vaulter and coach
  1971   – Petr Nedvěd, Czech-Canadian ice hockey player
1972 – Reiko Aylesworth, American actress
  1972   – Tré Cool, German-American drummer and songwriter
  1972   – Michael Corcoran, American singer-songwriter and producer
  1972   – Saima Wazed Hossain, Bangladeshi psychologist 
  1972   – Fabrice Santoro, Tahitian-French tennis player and sportscaster
1973 – Stacey Abrams, American politician and activist
  1973   – Fabio Artico, Italian footballer
  1973   – Vénuste Niyongabo, Burundian runner
  1973   – Bárbara Padilla, Mexican-American soprano
1974 – Canibus, Jamaican-American rapper
  1974   – Wendy Dillinger, American soccer player, coach, and manager
  1974   – Aloísio da Silva Filho, Brazilian footballer
  1974   – Fiona MacDonald, Scottish curler
1976 – Chris Booker, American baseball player
1976 – Mona Hanna-Attisha, American pediatrician, professor, and public health advocate 
1977 – Shayne Graham, American football player
  1977   – Imogen Heap, English singer-songwriter and keyboard player 
1978 – Gastón Gaudio, Argentinian tennis player
  1978   – Jesse Metcalfe, American actor and musician
1979 – Olivia Lufkin, Japanese-American singer-songwriter 
  1979   – Stephen McPhail, Irish footballer
  1979   – Aiko Uemura, Japanese skier
1980 – Simon Helberg, American actor, comedian, and musician
  1980   – Ryder Hesjedal, Canadian cyclist
  1980   – Mark Riddell, Australian rugby league player and sportscaster
1981 – Mardy Fish, American tennis player
1982 – Tamilla Abassova, Russian cyclist
  1982   – Nathalie De Vos, Belgian runner
  1982   – Ryan Grant, American football player
  1982   – Bastian Swillims, German sprinter
1983 – Jermaine Beckford, English-Jamaican footballer
  1983   – Neslihan Demir Darnel, Turkish volleyball player
  1983   – Dariusz Dudka, Polish footballer
  1984   – Ángel Guirado, Spanish–Filipino footballer
  1984   – Leon Hall, American football player
1985 – Wil Besseling, Dutch golfer
1987 – Kostas Giannoulis, Greek footballer
  1987   – Mat Latos, American baseball player
  1987   – Hikaru Nakamura, Japanese-American chess player
1988 – Kwadwo Asamoah, Ghanaian footballer
1990 – Denise Hannema, Dutch cricketer
1991 – Choi Minho, Korean singer and actor
1993 – Mark McMorris,  Canadian snowboarder
  1993   – Laura Smulders, Dutch cyclist 
1995 – McKayla Maroney, American gymnast
1996 – Kyle Connor, American ice hockey player
1996 – MyKayla Skinner, American gymnast
1999 – Riley Clemmons, American Christian musician 
2000 – Diāna Ņikitina, Latvian figure skater

Deaths

Pre-1600
 638 – Sergius I of Constantinople
 730 – Al-Jarrah ibn Abdallah, Arab general
 748 – Nasr ibn Sayyar, Umayyad general and politician (b. 663)
 933 – Li Congrong, prince of Later Tang
1117 – Gertrude of Brunswick, Markgräfin of Meißen
1165 – Malcolm IV of Scotland (b. 1141)
1242 – Richard le Gras, Lord Keeper of England and Abbot of Evesham
1268 – Vaišvilkas, Prince of Black Ruthenia, Grand Duke of Lithuania
1299 – Bohemond I, Archbishop of Trier
1437 – Sigismund, Holy Roman Emperor (b. 1368)
1544 – Teofilo Folengo, Italian poet (b. 1491)
1565 – Pope Pius IV (b. 1499)

1601–1900
1603 – William Watson, English priest (b. 1559)
1625 – Ubbo Emmius, Dutch historian and geographer (b. 1547)
1636 – Fabian Birkowski, Polish preacher and author (b. 1566)
1641 – Anthony van Dyck, Belgian-English painter and illustrator (b. 1599)
1669 – Pope Clement IX (b. 1600)
1674 – Edward Hyde, 1st Earl of Clarendon, English historian and politician, Chancellor of the Exchequer (b. 1609)
1706 – Peter II of Portugal (b. 1648)
1718 – Vincenzo Coronelli, Italian monk and cartographer (b. 1650)
  1761   – Tarabai, Queen of Chatrapati Rajaram (b. 1675)
1793 – Yolande de Polastron, French-Austrian educator (b. 1749)
1798 – Johann Reinhold Forster, German pastor, botanist, and ornithologist (b. 1729)
1830 – Heinrich Christian Friedrich Schumacher, Danish surgeon, botanist, and academic (b. 1757)
1854 – Almeida Garrett, Portuguese journalist and author (b. 1799)
1858 – Robert Baldwin, Canadian lawyer and politician, 3rd Premier of Canada West (b. 1804)
1887 – Mahmadu Lamine, Senegalese religious leader

1901–present
1906 – Ferdinand Brunetière, French author and critic (b. 1849)
1916 – Natsume Sōseki, Japanese author and poet (b. 1867)
1924 – Bernard Zweers, Dutch composer and educator (b. 1854)
1930 – Rube Foster, American baseball player and manager (b. 1879)
1932 – Karl Blossfeldt, German photographer, sculptor, and educator (b. 1865)
  1932   – Begum Rokeya, Bangladeshi social worker and author (b. 1880)
1935 – Walter Liggett, American journalist and activist (b. 1886)
1937 – Lilias Armstrong, English phonetician (b. 1882)
  1937   – Gustaf Dalén, Swedish physicist and engineer, Nobel Prize laureate (b. 1869)
1941 – Dmitry Merezhkovsky, Russian author, poet, and philosopher (b. 1865)
1943 – Georges Dufrénoy, French painter (b. 1870)
1944 – Laird Cregar, American actor (b. 1913)
1945 – Yun Chi-ho, South Korean activist and politician (b. 1864)
1957 – Ali İhsan Sâbis, Turkish general (b. 1882)
1963 – Daniel O. Fagunwa, Nigerian author and educator (b. 1903)
  1963   – Perry Miller, American historian, author, and academic (b. 1905)
1964 – Edith Sitwell, English poet and critic (b. 1887)
1965 – Branch Rickey, American baseball player and manager (b. 1884)
1967 – Charles Léon Hammes, Luxembourgian lawyer and judge, 3rd President of the European Court of Justice (b. 1898)
1968 – Enoch L. Johnson, American mob boss (b. 1883)
1970 – Artem Mikoyan, Armenian-Russian engineer and businessman, co-founded the Mikoyan Company (b. 1905)
  1970   – Feroz Khan Noon, Pakistani politician, 7th Prime Minister of Pakistan (b. 1893)
1971 – Ralph Bunche, American political scientist, academic, and diplomat, Nobel Prize laureate (b. 1904)
  1971   – Sergey Konenkov, Russian sculptor and painter (b. 1874)
  1971   – Rev. Aeneas Francon Williams, Church of Scotland Minister, Missionary in India and China, writer and poet (b. 1886)
1972 – Louella Parsons, American writer and columnist (b. 1881)
1975 – William A. Wellman, American actor, director, producer, and screenwriter (b. 1896)
1979 – Fulton J. Sheen, American archbishop (b. 1895)
1982 – Leon Jaworski, American lawyer and politician (b. 1905)
1991 – Berenice Abbott, American photographer (b. 1898)
1992 – Vincent Gardenia, American actor (b. 1922)
1993 – Danny Blanchflower, Northern Irish footballer and manager (b. 1926)
1995 – Toni Cade Bambara, American author and academic (b. 1939)
  1995   – Douglas Corrigan, American pilot (b. 1907)
1996 – Patty Donahue, American singer-songwriter (b. 1956)
  1996   – Mary Leakey, English archaeologist and anthropologist (b. 1913)
  1996   – Alain Poher, French lawyer and politician (b. 1909)
  1996   – Diana Morgan, Welsh playwright and screenwriter (b. 1908)
1998 – Shaughnessy Cohen, Canadian lawyer and politician (b. 1948)
  1998   – Archie Moore, American boxer and actor (b. 1913)
2001 – Michael Carver, Baron Carver, English field marshal (b. 1915)
2002 – Mary Hansen, Australian singer and guitarist (b. 1966)
  2002   – Ian Hornak, American painter and sculptor (b. 1944)
  2002   – Stan Rice, American painter and poet (b. 1942)
2003 – Norm Sloan, American basketball player and coach (b. 1926)
  2003   – Paul Simon, American soldier, journalist, and politician, 39th Lieutenant Governor of Illinois (b. 1928)
2005 – György Sándor, Hungarian-American pianist and educator (b. 1912)
  2005   – Robert Sheckley, American author (b. 1928)
2006 – Georgia Gibbs, American singer (b. 1919)
2007 – Rafael Sperafico, Brazilian race car driver (b. 1981)
  2007   – Gordon Zahn, American sociologist, author, and academic (b. 1918)
2008 – Ibrahim Dossey, Ghanaian footballer (b. 1972)
  2008   – Yury Glazkov, Russian general, pilot, and astronaut (b. 1939)
2009 – Gene Barry, American actor (b. 1919)
2010 – James Moody, American saxophonist, flute player, and composer (b. 1925)
  2010   – Dov Shilansky, Lithuanian-Israeli lawyer and politician, 10th Speaker of the Knesset (b. 1924)
2012 – Béla Nagy Abodi, Hungarian painter and academic (b. 1918)
  2012   – Patrick Moore, English lieutenant, astronomer, and educator (b. 1923)
  2012   – Alex Moulton, English engineer and businessman, founded the Moulton Bicycle Company (b. 1920)
  2012   – Jenni Rivera, American singer-songwriter, producer, and actress (b. 1969)
  2012   – Charles Rosen, American pianist and musicologist (b. 1927)
  2012   – Riccardo Schicchi, Italian director and producer, co-founded Diva Futura (b. 1953)
  2012   – Norman Joseph Woodland, American inventor, co-created the bar code (b. 1921)
2013 – Hristu Cândroveanu, Romanian editor, literary critic and writer (b. 1928)
  2013   – John Gabbert, American soldier, lawyer, and judge (b. 1909)
  2013   – Barbara Hesse-Bukowska, Polish pianist and educator (b. 1930)
  2013   – Eleanor Parker, American actress (b. 1922)
  2013   – John Wilbur, American football player (b. 1943)
2014 – Sacvan Bercovitch, Canadian-American author, critic, and academic (b. 1933)
  2014   – Jane Freilicher, American painter and poet (b. 1924)
  2014   – Jorge María Mejía, Argentinian cardinal (b. 1923)
  2014   – Mary Ann Mobley, American model and actress, Miss America 1959 (b. 1937)
  2014   – Blagoje Paunović, Serbian footballer and manager (b. 1947)
  2014   – Jože Toporišič, Slovenian linguist and author (b. 1926)
2015 – Soshana Afroyim, Austrian painter (b. 1927)
  2015   – Norman Breslow, American statistician and academic (b. 1941)
  2015   – Juvenal Juvêncio, Brazilian lawyer and politician (b. 1934)
  2015   – Julio Terrazas Sandoval, Bolivian cardinal (b. 1936)
2021 – Speedy Duncan, American football player (b. 1942)
  2021   – Demaryius Thomas, American football player (b. 1987)
2022 – Jovit Baldivino, Filipino singer and actor (b. 1993)

Holidays and observances
Anna's Day, marks the day to start the preparation process of the lutefisk to be consumed on Christmas Eve, as well as a Swedish name day, celebrating all people named Anna. (Sweden and Finland)
Armed Forces Day (Peru) 
Christian feast day:
Feast of the Conception of the Most Holy Theotokos by St. Anne (Eastern Orthodox Church)
Juan Diego
Leocadia
Nectarius of Auvergne
Peter Fourier
December 9 (Eastern Orthodox liturgics)
Fatherland's Heroes Day (Russia)
Independence Day, celebrates the independence of Tanganyika from Britain in 1961. (Tanzania)
International Anti-Corruption Day (United Nations)
National Heroes Day, formerly V.C. Bird Day. (Antigua and Barbuda)
Navy Day (Sri Lanka)

References

External links

 BBC: On This Day
 
 Historical Events on December 9

Days of the year
December